The 2023 season is scheduled to be the Philadelphia Stars' second season in the United States Football League (USFL), their second season under head coach Bart Andrus and their first under general manager Michael Woods. They will look to improve on their previous season where they went 6-4 in the regular season and narrowly lost to the Birmingham Stallions in the 2022 USFL Championship Game.

Offseason

Stadium plans 
Shortly before the completion of the 2022 season, the USFL announced plans to move into two or four hubs for teams to play in. In November, the USFL was reportedly exploring options of having a hub in Metro Detroit, with possible locations being the Eastern Michigan Eagles' Rynearson Stadium and the Detroit Lions' Ford Field.

It was announced that the Stars would be playing their games in the Detroit, Michigan hub at Ford Field. They will share this hub with their North Division rival, the Michigan Panthers.

Draft 
The Stars clinched the 7th pick in the 2023 USFL Draft and hold the 7th pick in every round.

Personnel 
The Stars, like all other teams, have a 38-man active roster with a 7-man practice squad.

Roster

Staff

Schedule

Regular Season

Standings

References 

2023 in sports in Pennsylvania
2023 USFL season
Philadelphia Stars (2022)